B69 may refer to :
Tividale (village post code B69)
 Bundesstraße 69, a German road
 B69 (New York City bus) in Brooklyn
 Sicilian, Richter-Rauzer, Rauzer attack, 7...a6 defence, 11.Bxf6, Encyclopaedia of Chess Openings code

B-69 may refer to :
 B-69 Neptune, an American aircraft